Hendevan (also Romanized as Hendevān) is a village in Rahal Rural District, in the Central District of Khoy County, West Azerbaijan Province, Iran. At the 2006 census, its population was 327, in 71 families.

References 

Populated places in Khoy County